Can't Stop the Love may refer to:
Can't Stop the Love (album), 1985 album by Maze
"Can't Stop the Love" (song), 2014 song by Neon Jungle